Alfred Maurits Bergström (15 January 1869, Stockholm - 15 November 1930, Tullinge) was a Swedish artist and art professor at the Royal Swedish Academy of Fine Arts who worked as a painter, watercolorist and etcher.

Biography
His father, Jan Alfred, was an engraver and, at the age of thirteen, he began studying in his father's workshop. He attended the Royal Academy from 1887 to 1891 and was awarded a gold medal upon graduating. From 1894 to 1895, he lived in France on a scholarship. He also visited North Africa and the Netherlands. In Sweden, he painted seascapes and landscapes en plein aire. Many of his later works involved cityscapes in and around Stockholm. Winter motifs were a special favorite of his.

From 1898 to 1901, he taught landscape painting at the Academy; becoming a member there in 1900. From 1910 until his death, he was a Professor there. From 1900 to 1915, he served as one of a panel of experts that reviewed the statues at the Nationalmuseum. As a result of their recommendations, the entire collection was reorganized.

In 1908, a group of artists was commissioned to create new murals for the marble foyer of the Royal Dramatic Theatre. In addition to Bergström, this group included Carl Larsson, Gottfried Kallstenius and Gustaf Cederström.

The architect  designed a villa with a studio for Bergström in 1907, the year he married Augusta Gyllensvaan, an army officer's daughter. 

His younger brother was the opera singer, .

References

Sources 
 Brief biography @ the Konstnärlexikonett Amanda
 Biography from Svensk konst och svenska konstnärer i nittonde århundradet @ Project Runeberg 
 Biography @ the Svenskt biografiskt lexikon
 Biography from the Nordisk Familjebok (1904) @ Project Runeberg

External links

 More works by Bergström @ ArtNet
 British Museum, Collection database search

1869 births
1930 deaths
Swedish painters
Swedish watercolourists